Sverre J. Hoddevik (born 10 June 1946, in Selje) is a Norwegian politician for the Conservative Party.

He was elected to the Norwegian Parliament from Sogn og Fjordane in 1997, and was re-elected once, in 2001. (The Norwegian Parliament serves in four-year, fixed, terms.)

Hoddevik was a member of Selje municipality council from 1983 to 1997, and he served as mayor from 1990.

References

1946 births
Living people
Conservative Party (Norway) politicians
Mayors of places in Sogn og Fjordane
Members of the Storting
21st-century Norwegian politicians
20th-century Norwegian politicians